Wallquist is a Swedish surname, it may refer to:

 Benjamin Wallquist (born 2000), Austrian footballer
 Olof Wallquist (1755–1800), Swedish statesman and ecclesiastic

See also
 Wahlquist, a list of people with the surname

Swedish-language surnames